Alpha Flight members are fictional comic book characters in the Marvel Comics universe, featured mainly in the Alpha Flight series. In the comics, the Flight teams were created by Department H and tasked with protecting Canada.

The Alpha Flight

Alpha Flight

Original

Recruits

Re-formed (Volume 2)

Re-formed (Volume 3)

Alpha Flight temporal copies

Beta Flight

Gamma Flight

Omega Flight

References

Lists of Marvel Comics characters by organization
Members